Rupaidiha is a small Town in Bahraich district in the Indian state of Uttar Pradesh, near the India–Nepal border across from Nepalgunj. 
English medium schools like Assembly of God Church School, Promise Land Public School, Seemant Inter College And Graduation College is situated here.

Transport
A railway station named "Nepalganj Road" is on the Nepalgunj–Gonda route. Rupaidiha is on NH 927. Nepalese and Indian nationals may cross the border without restrictions. There is a customs checkpoint for goods and third country nationals.
UPSRTC has started Bus services from Rupaidiha to New Delhi and Lucknow. A bus service for Hill Stations like Shimla, Haridwar, Dehradun and even Chandigarh is also available. Bahraich is the last district of India Connected to the Nepal Border. You can reach Nepal by Bus, Train, and personal cab, which is just 55 km from Bahraich through Rupaidha.

External links
  Trains at Nepalganj Road

References

Villages in Bahraich district
Transit and customs posts along the India–Nepal border
Points for exit and entry of nationals from third countries along the India–Nepal border